Robert Selmer Bergland (July 22, 1928 – December 9, 2018) was an American politician.  He served as a member of the House of Representatives from Minnesota's 7th congressional district from 1971 to 1977, and he served as United States Secretary of Agriculture from 1977 until 1981, during the Carter administration.

Early life
Bergland was born near Roseau, Minnesota, the son of Mabel (Evans) and Selmer Bennett Bergland, a garage mechanic. He studied agriculture at the University of Minnesota in a two-year program. A farmer, he became an official of the Agricultural Stabilization and Conservation Service for the Department of Agriculture from 1963-68.

Career

U.S. Representative from Minnesota
Bergland was a member of the United States House of Representatives from 1971 to 1977 as a member of the Democratic-Farmer-Labor Party, entering the House by defeating U.S. Republican incumbent Odin Langen in 1970.  He was elected to the 92nd, 93rd, 94th, and 95th Congresses.  In Congress, he served on the House Committee on Agriculture's subcommittees for Conservation and Credit, and Livestock, Grains, Dairy, and Poultry.

U.S. Secretary of Agriculture
On January 22, 1977, Bergland resigned from the House shortly after the beginning of a new term, and was appointed by President Jimmy Carter as Secretary of Agriculture and served from January 23, 1977 until January 20, 1981.

A minor but much-celebrated struggle between the United States Department of Agriculture and the General Services Administration occurred during his tenure, resulting in the ironic dedication of the USDA executive cafeteria in honor of Alferd Packer in order to shame the General Services Administration into terminating the Nixon-era cafeteria services contract.

Post-Agricultural career
Following the end of the Carter administration in 1981, Bergland became the chairman of Farmland World Trade until 1982, when he became the vice president and general manager of the National Rural Electric Cooperative Association. In the latter capacity, Bergland lobbied both Congress and the regulatory agencies on behalf of the Cooperative's electricity business.

After retiring in 1994, Bergland was elected by the Minnesota State Legislature to a term on the University of Minnesota Board of Regents. Bergland retired after the one term and owned a  farm in Minnesota.

Personal life
He married Helen Elaine Grahn in 1950. They had seven children. Bergland died on December 9, 2018 at a nursing home in Roseau at the age of 90.

References

External links

Bob Bergland Papers, including extensive records of his congressional service, are available for research use at the Minnesota Historical Society.
Robert Selmer Bergland Collection - National Agricultural Library, includes pressing clippings and a photograph album.

|-

1928 births
2018 deaths
20th-century American politicians
American people of Norwegian descent
Carter administration cabinet members
American cooperative organizers
Democratic Party members of the United States House of Representatives from Minnesota
Farmers from Minnesota
People from Roseau, Minnesota
United States Secretaries of Agriculture
University of Minnesota College of Food, Agricultural and Natural Resource Sciences alumni